King Street is a street in central Cambridge, England. It connects between Sussex Street heading west and Hobson Street heading south at the western end and a large roundabout to the east. It runs parallel to and south of Jesus Lane. The roads link together at a roundabout at the eastern end. To the east is Maid's Causeway and then Newmarket Road leading out of Cambridge. To the north is Victoria Avenue between Jesus Green and Midsummer Common. To the south is Short Street, Cambridge, quickly leading into Emmanuel Road past Christ's Pieces.

Sidney Sussex College backs on to the street to the northwest. Christ's College is to the south, with some of its buildings on the street.

Public houses

There are currently four pubs on King Street:

 The King Street Run (86 King Street, previously named The Horse and Groom and dating back to at least the 1830s), named after an organized pub crawl of the same name
 The Champion of the Thames (68 King Street, in use as a pub since the late 1860s). Dostoyevsky is often seen at the bar reading a broadsheet.
 St Radegund, (129 King Street, built in 1880 on part of the site of the Garrick Hotel) named after the sixth-century saint, Radegund
 The Cambridge Brew House (1 King Street, previously the Jolly Scholar, the Bun Shop, the Kings Arms, the Royal Arms), built in the 1970s.

There are also a number of restaurants on the street.

Former public houses

The street was previously noted for the number of pubs and was at one stage synonymous with the King Street Run pub crawl. Former pubs on the street included (italicised street numbers indicate the numbering scheme prior to 1897):

The Boot (39/97 King Street)
Cambridge Ale Stores/Cambridge Arms (4/6 King Street. Now d'Arry's restaurant. Briefly called The Brewery, and Rattle and Hum in early 2000s)
Carpenters Arms (45/93&94 King Street. Closed c1900)
Earl Grey (34/60 King Street)
The Garrick Hotel or Garrick's Head (52 King Street, Briefly called The Shakespeare in the 1870s. Demolished prior to 1880 and now the partial site of the St Radegund)
Glaziers Arms (105 King Street. Closed late 19th century)
The Harp (84 King Street. Closed 1870s)
Millers Arms (11 King Street. Closed late 19th century)
Royal Arms (104&105/21 King Street)
Sebastopol (76 King Street. Closed late 19th century)
White Hart (22 King Street. Closed 1870s)
Yorkshire Grey (64 King Street. Closed late 19th century)

Pub crawl
The King Street Run is a bi-annual combined run and pub crawl that takes place along King Street. It is claimed to have started from a 1955 discussion between three undergraduates of St John's College, all either Royal Navy or Royal Marines, and a group of medical students of unknown college affiliation. The discussion centred on the drinking capacity of the human male, one of the medical students asserting that the male bladder could hold no more than four pints. The St John's students disagreed in principle and the group agreed to settle the argument by meeting on a specified evening and having a drink in every pub on King Street. After reportedly carrying out the feat of having a drink at each pub without stopping to urinate, the King Street Pint to Pint Club was formally constituted, with the basic objective drinking a pint of ale in seven of the street's pubs before returning for an eighth in the pub you started in. The club set rules to be observed for the duration of drinking, among which was a penalty pint awarded for the commission of either of the two Ps, “peeing or puking”. Successful members of the club wore a special navy blue tie decorated with the image of a tankard surmounted by a crown. The tie soon became a highly sought after item of apparel.

References 

Streets in Cambridge
Christ's College, Cambridge
Sidney Sussex College, Cambridge